The 2022 Winter Paralympics, officially the XIII Paralympic Winter Games, or the 13th Winter Paralympics, were held from 4 to 13 March 2022 in Beijing, China. There were 78 events in six winter sports.

Alpine skiing

Biathlon

Cross-country skiing

Para ice hockey

Snowboarding

Wheelchair curling

See also
 2022 Winter Paralympics medal table

References

medal winners
Lists of Paralympic medalists
Winter Paralympics medalists